Exerodonta xera is a species of frog in the family Hylidae.
It is endemic to Mexico.
Its natural habitats are subtropical or tropical moist montane forests, subtropical or tropical dry shrubland, and rivers.
It is threatened by habitat loss.

References

Sources

Exerodonta
Amphibians described in 1994
Taxonomy articles created by Polbot